Yoann Bernard Kongolo is a Swiss boxer and Muay Thai kickboxer of DR Congo descent who competes in the light heavyweight division of the Glory. He has also competed for SUPERKOMBAT. 

He was ranked in the welterweight top 10 by Combat Press.

Kickboxing career

Early years 
Kongolo was scheduled to fight Miran Fabjan for the WKN European Super Middleweight title. Kongolo won the fight by decision. He made his first title defense against Peter Baumler, winning by a first round KO.

In 2014, he fought Roberto Cocco for the  WKN Intercontinental Super Middleweight Championship. Kongolo won the fight by split decision.

SUPERKOMBAT
At the end of 2014, after the victory over Cédric Doumbé in the regional circuit, Kongolo signed with the largest continental promotion SUPERKOMBAT Fighting Championship. He made his debut in native Switzerland on 25 October 2014 against Jamie Bates at SUPERKOMBAT World Grand Prix 2014 Final Elimination, stopping him in the 3rd round in light-heavyweight title eliminator.

GLORY
Next year, Kongolo signed with the largest promotion in the world Glory and fought in the 2015 Glory Welterweight Contender tournament. He lost to Karim Ghajji in the semifinals.

During Glory 29, Kongolo challenged for the Glory Welterweight title, held at the time by Nieky Holzken. Holzken won the fight by unanimous decision.

He participated in the 2016 Glory Welterweight Contender Tournament. He managed to win a split decision against Harut Grigorian in the semifinals, but lost a unanimous decision to Murthel Groenhart in the finals.

Kongolo took part in the 2017 Glory Welterweight Contender Tournament. In the semifinals, he won a unanimous decision against  Konstantin Khuzin. In the finals, he prevailed against Karim Benmansour by a third round TKO.

Yoann was scheduled to fight a rematch with Cedric Doumbe during Glory 39, for the Glory Welterweight title. Kongolo was less successful then in their first fight, losing by unanimous decision.

Kongolo was scheduled to fight Yohan Lidon during Glory 42: Paris. Yoann won the fight by unanimous decision.

He fought Abdallah Mabel in November 2018. Kongolo won the fight by unanimous decision.

Kongolo fought Dmitry Menshikov during Glory 69: Düsseldorf. He lost the fight at the tail end of the second round, by TKO, as the ringside doctor stopped the fight.

Doping suspension
On 11 September 2019, it was announced that Kongolo was sanctioned by the National Anti-Doping Agency of France with a 4-year ban and a fine of €5,000 due to the presence of methandrostenolone and stanozolol. The ban applies from 30 September 2019. Kongolo tested positive on 4 August 2018 at Fight Night in Saint-Tropez, France.

Professional boxing career
In 2017 Kongolo fought Salambek Baysangurov for the vacant World Boxing Council International Silver Light Heavyweight title. He won the fight by majority decision. He successfully defended the title against Andrejs Pokumeiko, winning by unanimous decision.

He won the vacant EBU External Light Heavyweight title with a decision win against Enes Zecirevic.

Championships and accomplishments

Kickboxing
Glory 
2017 Glory Welterweight Contender Tournament Champion 
2016 Glory Welterweight Contender Tournament Runner Up 

SUPERKOMBAT Fighting Championship 
2014 Best Debut 

World Kickboxing Network
WKN European Super Middleweight (-79.40 kg/175 lb) Championship  (One time) 
Swiss Kickbox Federation (SKBF) 
2010 Swiss Championship Class A
2009 Swiss Championship Class B

Muay Thai
Swiss Muay Thai Federation 
2010 Swiss (-81 kg) Championship Class A (SG) 
2009 Swiss Championship Class B (SG) 
2009 Swiss (-81 kg) Championship Class B (WH)

Boxing
World Boxing Council
2017 World Boxing Council International Silver Light Heavy Title
European Boxing Council
2017 EBU External Light Heavy Title

Karate
World Koshiki Karatedo Federation (WKKF)
2009 World Koshiki Karatedo Championship in Tokyo, Japan on Kumite Rules (Singles) Bronze Medalist
2009 World Koshiki Karatedo Championship in Tokyo, Japan on Kata Kumite Bunkai Rules (Team) Bronze Medalist
2007 World Koshiki Karatedo Championship in Montreal, Canada on Kumite Rules (Heavyweight Singles) Silver Medalist
2007 World Koshiki Karatedo Championship in Montreal, Canada on Kata Kumite Bunkai Rules (Heavyweight Team) Silver Medalist

Boxing record

Kickboxing record

|- style="background:#fbb;"
| 2019-10-12 || Loss ||align=left| Dmitry Menshikov || Glory 69: Düsseldorf || Düsseldorf, Germany || TKO (Doctor Stoppage) || 2 || 2:59
|-  bgcolor="#CCFFCC"
| 2018-10-27 || Win  ||align=left| Abdallah Mabel || Fight Legend Geneva || Geneva, Switzerland || Decision (Unanimous) || 3 || 3:00
|-  bgcolor="#CCFFCC"
| 2017-06-10 || Win ||align=left| Yohan Lidon || Glory 42: Paris|| Paris, France || Decision (unanimous)  || 3 || 3:00
|-
|- style="background:#fbb;"
| 2017-03-25 || Loss ||align=left| Cedric Doumbe || Glory 39: Brussels || Brussels, Belgium || Decision (unanimous)  || 5  || 3:00
|-
|-  bgcolor="#CCFFCC"
| 2017-01-20 || Win ||align=left| Karim Benmansour || Glory 37: Los Angeles, Final || Los Angeles, California, US || TKO (punches) || 3 || 2:57 
|- 
! style=background:white colspan=9 |
|-
|-  bgcolor="#CCFFCC"
| 2017-01-20 || Win ||align=left| Konstantin Khuzin || Glory 37: Los Angeles, Semi Finals || Los Angeles, California, US || Decision (unanimous) || 3 || 3:00 
|- 
|-  bgcolor="#FFBBBB"
| 2016-06-25 || Loss||align=left| Murthel Groenhart || Glory 31: Amsterdam, Final || Amsterdam, Netherlands || Decision (Unanimous) || 3 || 3:00
|-
! style=background:white colspan=9 |
|-
|-  bgcolor="#CCFFCC"
| 2016-06-25 || Win ||align=left| Harut Grigorian || Glory 31: Amsterdam, Semi Finals || Amsterdam, Netherlands || Decision (Split) || 3 || 3:00
|-
|-  bgcolor="#FFBBBB"
| 2016-04-16 || Loss ||align=left| Nieky Holzken || Glory 29: Copenhagen || Copenhagen, Denmark || Decision (unanimous) || 5 || 3:00
|-
! style=background:white colspan=9 |
|-  bgcolor="#CCFFCC"
| 2015-12-04 || Win ||align=left| Karapet Karapetyan || Glory 26: Amsterdam || Amsterdam, Netherlands || Decision (unanimous) || 3 || 3:00
|-
|-  bgcolor="#FFBBBB"
| 2015-11-06 || Loss ||align=left| Karim Ghajji || Glory 25: Milan, Semi Finals || Monza, Italy || Decision (Majority) || 3 || 3:00
|-
|-  bgcolor="#CCFFCC"
| 2015-06-05 || Win ||align=left| Cedric Doumbe || Glory 22: Lille || Lille, France || Decision (unanimous) || 3 || 3:00
|-
|-  bgcolor="#CCFFCC"
| 2014-10-25 || Win ||align=left| Jamie Bates || SUPERKOMBAT World Grand Prix 2014 Final Elimination || Geneva, Switzerland || KO (spinning back fist/right flying knee) || 3 ||
|-
! style=background:white colspan=9 | 
|-
|-  bgcolor="#CCFFCC"
| 2014-09-27 || Win ||align=left| Cedric Doumbe || Jurafight || Delémont, Switzerland || Decision (unanimous) || 5 ||
|-
|-  bgcolor="#CCFFCC"
| 2014-08-04 || Win ||align=left| Nicola Gallo || Fight Night Saint-Tropez II || Saint-Tropez, France || Decision || 3 ||
|-
|- style="background:#fbb;"
| 2014-01-25 || Loss ||align=left| Roberto Cocco || Thai Boxe Mania || Turin, Italy || Decision (split) || 5 ||
|-
! style=background:white colspan=9 | 
|-
|-  bgcolor="#CCFFCC"
| 2013-12-14 || Win ||align=left| Aidan Brooks || KickMas 2013 || Belfast, Northern Ireland || Decision || 3 ||
|- 
|- style="background:#fbb;"
| 2013-11-23 || Loss ||align=left| Karim Benmansour || La 20ème Nuit des Champions|| Marseilles, France || Decision || 3 ||
|-
|-  bgcolor="#CCFFCC"
| 2013-05-25 || Win ||align=left| Peter Baumler || Nuit Des Sports De Combat || Geneva, Switzerland || KO || 1 ||
|-
! style=background:white colspan=9 |
|-
|-  bgcolor="#CCFFCC"
| 2012-10-06 || Win ||align=left| Miran Fabjan || Kick Boxing || Villars, Switzerland || Decision || 5 ||
|-
! style=background:white colspan=9 |
|- 
|-  bgcolor="#CCFFCC"
| 2012-08-18 || Win ||align=left| Miran Fabjan || Admiral Markets Fight Night || Portorož, Slovenia || Decision || 3 ||
|- 
|-  bgcolor="#CCFFCC"
| 2012-06-02 || Win ||align=left| Sławomir Przypis || Nuit des Sports de Combat IX || Geneva, Switzerland || TKO || 4 ||
|- 
|-  bgcolor="#CCFFCC"
| 2012-04-28 || Win ||align=left| Malik Aliane || Le Banner Series Acte 1  || Geneva, Switzerland || Decision || 4 ||
|- 
|-  bgcolor="#CCFFCC"
| 2012-03-24 || Win ||align=left| Davide Mosca || Oktagon 2012|| Milan, Italy || TKO (corner stoppage) || 3 || 
|-
|-  bgcolor="#CCFFCC"
| 2011-11-26 || Win ||align=left| Hicham Zentari || Fight Code: Rhinos Series|| Geneva, Switzerland || TKO (Body Kick) || 2 ||
|-
|-
| colspan=9 | Legend:

See also 
List of male kickboxers
List of male boxers

References

External links
Profile at GLORY
Boxing Record at BoxRec

1987 births
Living people
Middleweight kickboxers
Light-heavyweight boxers
Swiss male kickboxers
Swiss Muay Thai practitioners
Swiss male boxers
Swiss male karateka
Swiss people of Malian descent
Glory kickboxers
SUPERKOMBAT kickboxers
Doping cases in kickboxing